The Caldwell Carnegie Library, located at 13 N. Osage St. in Caldwell, Kansas, was completed in 1912.  It was listed on the National Register of Historic Places in 1983.

It is a Carnegie library designed by Wichita architect Fred G. McCune.  It is a  concrete block building with a brick veneer.

References

Libraries on the National Register of Historic Places in Kansas
Library buildings completed in 1912
National Register of Historic Places in Sumner County, Kansas
Carnegie libraries in Kansas